Slavutych is a station on Kyiv Metro's Syretsko-Pecherska Line. It is situated between Vydubychi and Osokorky stations and was opened on 30 December 1992.

The station was designed by architect Alyoshkin. Slavutych station has 2 entrances. This station is situated on Mykoly Bazhana Avenue near the Southern Metro Bridge. This station is situated near the Dnieper river, Slavutych being an old name of the river.

Slavutych station is served by trains from 05:43hrs to 00:12hrs.

References

Kyiv Metro stations
Railway stations opened in 1992
1992 establishments in Ukraine